Cancel My Reservation is a 1972 American comedy film starring Bob Hope and Eva Marie Saint, and directed by Paul Bogart. The movie was Bob Hope's last of over 50 theatrical features as leading man, a screen run begun in 1938. It was also Eva Marie Saint's last film before she took a break from the big screen until 1986's Nothing in Common.

Plot

Television personality Dan Bartlett, having difficulties with his wife and TV co-star Sheila, retreats to his Arizona ranch. When the body of Mary Little Cloud is found in the back seat of his car, Dan is placed under arrest.

Freed for lack of evidence, Dan returns home to find attractive, scantily clad Crazy Hollister there. Her stepfather John Ed owns a 50,000 acre property nearby. Crazy is upset that John Ed has blocked her inheritance and may have even murdered her mother.

Sheila shows up and believes she has caught Dan having an affair, but Crazy convinces her that's not true. Meanwhile, county recorder Snagby tries to blackmail John Ed with information Mary Little Cloud gave him, but John Ed's evil henchman Reese has him killed. Sheriff Riley once again thinks Dan is responsible.

The Bartletts are taken captive by Reese and sealed inside a cave. There they renew their love. Riley is able to free them while Crazy finds proof that Mary Little Cloud had a document showing her tribe to be the lawful owner of John Ed's land. Reese is betrayed by John Ed, who ultimately learns that crime doesn't pay. Dan and Sheila can't wait to get back to their old lives.

Cast
 Bob Hope as Dan Bartlett
 Eva Marie Saint as Sheila Bartlett
 Ralph Bellamy as John Ed
 Forrest Tucker as Reese
 Anne Archer as Crazy Hollister
 Keenan Wynn as Sheriff 'Houndtooth' Riley
 Chief Dan George as 'Old Bear'
 Pat Morita as Yamamoto
 Tracy Bogart as Teenage Girl
 Betty Ann Carr as Mary Little Cloud
 Henry Darrow as Joe Little Cloud
 Doodles Weaver as Cactus (Deputy Sheriff)

Uncredited cameo appearances
 Johnny Carson as himself
 Bing Crosby as himself
 John Wayne as himself
 Flip Wilson as himself

Reception 

Like most of Bob Hope's later movie efforts, Cancel My Reservation was not a success at the box office and was panned by critics. Hope and his wife Dolores attended the film's premiere at Radio City Music Hall in New York City (incidentally during a strike by the Musicians' Union, which prevented the band or the Rockettes from performing) and he reputedly bemoaned that he was getting too old to play a leading man and therefore would not make another feature film, although he would make cameo appearances in later films.

References

External links
 

1972 films
1972 comedy films
American comedy mystery films
1970s comedy mystery films
1970s English-language films
Films directed by Paul Bogart
Films based on works by Louis L'Amour
Films scored by Dominic Frontiere
Films set in Arizona
Warner Bros. films
1970s American films